Steinthal is a surname. Notable people with the surname include:

 Fritz Leopold Steinthal (1889-1969), :de:Fritz Leoold Steinthal, German rabbi
 Heymann Steinthal (May 16, 1823 – March 14, 1899), German philologist and philosopher
 Max Steinthal (December 24, 1850 in Berlin; December 8, 1940 in Berlin), German banker